Dakuaan Da Munda 2 (English: The Bandits’ Son 2) is a 2022 Indian Punjabi autobiographical film based on the life of a drug addict Manga Singh Antal. The film is an adaptation of a Punjabi book named Shararti Tatt, which narrates the life and hardships faced by Manga Singh Antal. The film is directed by Mandeep Benipal under the banner of Dream Reality Movies. The film is produced by Ravneet Kaur Chahal, Rajesh Kumar Arora and Ashu Munish Sahni. The film features Dev Kharoud, Japji Khaira, Nishawn Bhullar, Raj Singh Jhinger in lead characters along with Lucky Dhaliwal and Karanveer Khullar. The film is a sequel to 2018 film Dakuan Da Munda. The film was released worldwide in cinemas on 27 May 2022.

Premise
An autobiography of the famous writer and teacher Manga Singh Antal, a young Kabaddi and Volleyball player Manga became a drug addict which introduced him to crime.

Cast
 Dev Kharoud as Manga Singh Antal
 Japji Khaira
 Nishawn Bhullar
 Raj Singh Jhinger
 Lucky Dhaliwal
 Karanveer Khullar
 Preet Baath
 Balwinder Bullet
 Deep Mandeep
 Sahib Singh
 Anita Meet
 Gurmukh Ginni
 Bobby Aujla

Production
The film was announced in 2019. The shooting of the film started in November 2020 near Ambala, Chandigarh and Punjab
The teaser of the film was released on 10 April 2022. The trailer was released on 1 May 2022.

Music
The music of the film is composed by Nick Dhammu and Haakam and lyrics are written by Veet Baljit and Gill Raunta. The film's background score is composed by Salil Amrute.

Release 
The film was released worldwide in cinemas on 27 May 2022.

References

External links
 

2022 films
Punjabi-language Indian films